Steven Wright (born 1955) is an American comedian and actor.

Steven, Steve or Stevie Wright may also refer to:

Steve Wright (American football, born 1942), American football offensive tackle
Steve Wright (American football, born 1959), American football offensive lineman and Survivor contestant
Steven Wright (baseball) (born 1984), American baseball player
Steve Wright (DJ) (born 1954), British radio broadcaster
Steve Wright (serial killer) (born 1958), British serial killer
Steve Wright (bassist) (1950–2017), bassist with the Greg Kihn Band
Steve Wright (footballer, born 1893) (1893–1959), English football player, manager and trainer
Steve Wright (footballer, born 1959) (born 1959), English footballer
Steve Wright (wrestler), English professional wrestler, father and trainer of German professional wrestler Alex Wright
Stevie Wright (1947–2015), English pop singer prominent in Australia

See also
Stephen Wright (disambiguation)